
Kartuzy County is a county in the Pomeranian Voivodeship, Poland, with administrative seat and largest town being Kartuzy.

It came into being on 1 January 1999, as a result of the Polish local government reforms passed in 1998. The only other town in the county is Żukowo. As of 2019 its total population is 137,942, out of which the population of Kartuzy is 14,536, that of Żukowo is 6,691, and the rural population is 116,715.

Kartuzy County on a map of the counties of Pomeranian Voivodeship

Kartuzy County is bordered by Wejherowo County to the north, the city of Gdynia to the north-east, the city of Gdańsk and Gdańsk County to the east, Kościerzyna County to the south, Bytów County to the west, and Lębork County to the north-west.

Administrative division
The county is subdivided into eight gminas (two urban-rural and six rural). These are listed in the following table, in descending order of population.

References

 
Kartuzy